"If I Ain't Got You" is a song recorded by American singer-songwriter Alicia Keys for her second studio album The Diary of Alicia Keys (2003). Inspired by the 2001 death of singer Aaliyah, the September 11 attacks, and other events in the world and in Keys' life, the song is about "how material things don't feed the soul". It was released as the second single from The Diary of Alicia Keys on February 17, 2004, by J Records. The single cover depicts Keys similarly to the subject of Man Ray's 1924 photograph Le Violon d'Ingres.

"If I Ain't Got You" peaked at number four on the US Billboard Hot 100 and became Keys' second consecutive R&B chart-topper, remaining atop of the Hot R&B/Hip-Hop Songs chart for six weeks. The song received two nominations at the 47th Annual Grammy Awards (2005), for Song of the Year and Best Female R&B Vocal Performance, winning the latter. It was ranked at number 440 on Rolling Stones "Top 500 Best Songs of All Time". Since its release, Keys has herself said that it is one of her favorite songs.

Background
Keys said that the idea of the song was inspired by Aaliyah's death: "The song idea came together right after Aaliyah passed away. It was such a sad time and no one wanted to believe it. It just made everything crystal clear to me—what matters, and what doesn't."

In September 2020, Keys revealed that she almost offered the song to Christina Aguilera, as the singer wanted to work with Keys. She eventually wrote the song "Impossible" for Aguilera's album Stripped.

Commercial performance
"If I Ain't Got You" debuted on the Billboard Hot 100 at number sixty-four on the issue dated March 6, 2004, peaking at number four, four months later, on July 3, 2004. It spent twenty non-consecutive weeks in the top ten, one of the longest stays of any song that year and outlasting many number one singles. The song topped the Hot R&B/Hip-Hop Songs on May 1, 2004, and spent six non-consecutive weeks atop the chart. It was also successful on Billboard component charts, reaching number five on the Rhythmic Top 40 and number nine on the Mainstream Top 40. The single was ultimately placed at number three on the Billboard Year-End Hot 100 chart of 2004.

In the United Kingdom, "If I Ain't Got You" debuted and peaked at number eighteen on the UK Singles Chart for the week ending April 10, 2004. In late September 2009, the single returned to the chart at number fifty-four.

In September 2016, Keys appeared on The Voice as a coach, with a contestant singing the song, and it made a new entry into the R&B/Hip Hop singles charts, driving total sales up to 1.5 million units. By August 2020, the song had reached 4× Platinum certification.

Music video
The music video for "If I Ain't Got You", directed by Diane Martel, was filmed in Harlem, New York City, and features a cameo by rapper and actor Method Man as Keys' on-screen boyfriend.

Awards
Grammy Awards
Best Female R&B Vocal Performance
Billboard Music Awards
R&B/Hip-Hop Single of the Year
R&B/Hip-Hop Airplay Single of the Year
MTV Video Music Awards
Best R&B Video
ASCAP Rhythm & Soul Awards
Top R&B/Hip-Hop Song of the Year
ASCAP Pop Awards
Most Performed Song
NAACP Image Awards
Outstanding Music Video
Outstanding Song
Soul Train Music Awards
Best R&B/Soul Single, Female
Soul Train Lady of Soul Awards
Best R&B/Soul or Rap Song of the Year
Vibe Awards
Best R&B Song

Track listings and formatsEuropean CD single "If I Ain't Got You" (Album Version) – 3:54
 "You Don't Know My Name/Will You Ever Know It" (Reggae Mix) – 5:06European CD Maxi-single "If I Ain't Got You" (Album Version) – 3:48
 "If I Ain't Got You" (Piano/Vocal Version) – 3:54
 "You Don't Know My Name/Will You Ever Know It" (Reggae Mix) – 5:06
 "If I Ain't Got You" (Video)European CD single (Remix) "If I Ain't Got You" (featuring Usher) – 3:52
 "If I Ain't Got You" (Album Version) – 3:51
 "If I Ain't Got You" (Piano/Vocal Version) – 3:51Japanese CD single "If I Ain't Got You" (Album Version) – 3:49
 "If I Ain't Got You" (Piano + Vocal Only Version) – 3:49
 "If I Ain't Got You" (Acappella Version) – 3:33US promotional CD single "If I Ain't Got You" (Radio Edit) – 3:48
 "If I Ain't Got You" (Instrumental) – 3:48
 "If I Ain't Got You" (Call Out Hook) – 0:10US 7" singleA. "If I Ain't Got You" (Album Version) – 3:48
B. "Diary" (Album Version) (featuring Tony! Toni! Toné!) – 3:43US 12" singleA1. "If I Ain't Got You" (Radio Mix) – 3:48
A2. "If I Ain't Got You" (Instrumental) – 3:48
B1. "If I Ain't Got You" (Radio Mix) – 3:48
B2. "If I Ain't Got You" (Acappella) – 3:36US / European promotional 12" singleA1. "If I Ain't Got You" (Main) – 3:48
A2. "If I Ain't Got You" (Instrumental) – 3:48
B1. "If I Ain't Got You" (Main) – 3:48
B2. "If I Ain't Got You" (Acappella) – 3:36Digital EP "If I Ain't Got You" (featuring Usher) – 3:51
 "If I Ain't Got You" (Radio Edit) – 3:51
 "If I Ain't Got You" (featuring Arturo Sandoval) (Spanish Version) – 3:51
 "If I Ain't Got You" (Kanye West Radio Mix #1) – 3:47
 "If I Ain't Got You" (Piano & Vocal Version) – 3:51
 "If I Ain't Got You" (The Black Eyed Peas Remix) – 3:14Digital download'''
 "If I Ain't Got You" (The Black Eyed Peas Remix) – 3:14

Personnel
Credits adapted from the liner notes of The Diary of Alicia Keys''.

 Alicia Keys – piano, producer, background vocals, vocals 
 Katreese Barnes – background vocals
 Tony Black – engineering
 Kerry Brothers Jr. – digital programming
 Fred Cash Jr. – bass
 Darryl Dixon – horn
 L. Green – background vocals

 Steve Jordan – drums
 Manny Marroquin – mixing
 Hugh McCracken – guitar
 Cindy Mizelle – background vocals
 Herb Powers Jr. – mastering
 Joe Romano – horn
 Arcell Vickers – organ
 David Watson – horn

Charts

Weekly charts

Year-end charts

Decade-end charts

Certifications

Release history

See also
 Billboard Year-End Hot 100 singles of 2004
 List of Hot R&B/Hip-Hop Singles & Tracks number ones of 2004

References

2000s ballads
2003 songs
2004 singles
Alicia Keys songs
Contemporary R&B ballads
J Records singles
Music videos directed by Diane Martel
Songs written by Alicia Keys